Kenneth Harrison Earl Albury (born 9 January 1920) was a Bahamian sailor. He competed at the 1952, 1956, 1960 and the 1968 Summer Olympics.

References

External links
 

1920 births
Possibly living people
Bahamian male sailors (sport)
Olympic sailors of the Bahamas
Sailors at the 1952 Summer Olympics – Finn
Sailors at the 1956 Summer Olympics – Finn
Sailors at the 1960 Summer Olympics – Finn
Sailors at the 1968 Summer Olympics – Finn
People from Abaco Islands